Walloomsac, New York is a location in New York State, on the Walloomsac River.  It is to the east, and upstream, from North Hoosick, New York.  It includes the Bennington Battlefield, which was fought on both sides of the river and listed on the National Register of Historic Places in 1966. It is located in the northeast part of the Town of Hoosick, in Rensselaer County. The nearest community is Hoosick Falls, to its southwest.

References

Geography of Rensselaer County, New York